Empoasca flavescens is a species of true bug in the family Cicadellidae. It is a pest of millets such as sorghum in Asia.

References

Empoascini
Insect pests of millets